Emma Tremblay (born April 21, 2004) is a Canadian actress. Tremblay is known for her roles on the television series Supergirl and Wayward Pines, and the films Elysium, The Giver, and The Judge. She is the older sister of child actor Jacob Tremblay and Erica Tremblay.

On Supergirl, Tremblay was introduced in the third season and played Ruby Arias, the daughter of Samantha Arias (Odette Annable).

Filmography

Film

Television

References

External links

2004 births
21st-century Canadian actresses
Canadian child actresses
Canadian film actresses
Canadian television actresses
Living people